Island of Doomed Men is a 1940 American film noir crime film directed by Charles Barton and starring Peter Lorre.

Plot 

Stephen Danel lures paroled convicts to his isolated island where they are forced to work as slaves for life. Government agent Mark Sheldon aka "64" allows himself to be convicted of a murder he did not commit so that he can spend time in prison and then be paroled to work on Danel's island. It turns out that Danel's beautiful wife, Lorraine Danel, is a prisoner too.

Cast
 Peter Lorre as Stephen Danel
 Rochelle Hudson as Lorraine Danel
 Robert Wilcox as Mark Sheldon
 Don Beddoe as Brand 
 George E. Stone as Siggy
 Kenneth MacDonald as Doctor 
 Charles Middleton as Cort
 Stanley Brown as Eddie
 Earl Gunn as Mitchell

External links

References

1940 films
1940 crime films
American black-and-white films
American mystery films
Films directed by Charles Barton
American prison films
Films set on islands
Columbia Pictures films
1940 mystery films
Film noir
1940s English-language films
1940s American films